Champions: A Love Story is a 1979 American made-for-television drama sport film directed by John A. Alonzo and starring Shirley Knight, Tony Lo Bianco, Jimmy McNichol, Joy LeDuc, and Anne Schedeen.

Plot
Peter is a teenage ex-hockey player who falls in love with Carrie, a figure skater.

Cast

Production
The film's screenplay was written by television writer and producer John Sacret Young, who himself was a former hockey player.  Prior to writing the screenplay, Young had been unsuccessfully working as a novelist in Vermont. Commenting on the setting, Young said: "Skating is filled with stories that are very intense - the romances, the hatreds. I don't think that story's ever been told. Skating is a loose fraternity. They share something, the early morning practice, the rigorous training. It's like war veterans without the pall of death."

Young spent six months frequenting ice skating rinks in Colorado, and based many of the characters in the film real people he met there: "You go to any rink and 6 a.m. and here are these burly women in overcoats. They give their lives to this." Young was partly inspired to write the film after the 1961 Sabena Flight 548 plane crash that killed the entire U.S. Figure Skating team.

Reception
People magazine deemed the film a "surprisingly compelling 1979 TV movie." Jerry Buck of the Associated Press praised the film as "a warm story that bursts at the seams with vitality and life."

References

1979 television films
1979 films
American teen drama films
Figure skating films
American drama television films
Romance television films
Warner Bros. films
Films directed by John A. Alonzo
1970s American films